A logo is a graphic used to represent an entity.

Logo may also refer to:

Places
 Logo, Mali
 Logo, Nigeria

People
 Jerry West, aka "The Logo", American basketball player

Cultures and human languages
 Logo language 
 Logo people, an ethnic group

Arts, entertainment, and media
 Logo Board Game, often shortened to "LOGO"
 Logo Records, a record label
 Logo TV, a gay cable channel in the United States

Other uses
 Logo (programming language)
 Logo Yazılım, Turkish business software company
 Logo, the shortened word for a production logo, where a short animation plays to show a logo of a company
 Honda Logo, a car
 Logo! a small programmable logic controller by Siemens
 Sequence logo, bioinformatics

See also 

 
 Logos (disambiguation)

Language and nationality disambiguation pages